The Swedish Civil Protection Association Medal of Merit (SCFGM/SM) is a Swedish medal awarded by the Swedish Civil Protection Association (Sveriges Civilförsvarsförbund, SCF) for meritorious service.

History
The medal was established on 25 August 1941 as the National Aerial Protection Association Medal of Merit (RLSFM). On 17 July 1951, the medal change name to Swedish Civil Protection Association Medal of Merit.

Appearance

Medal
The medal is on the obverse fitted with the King's portrait and the inscription CARL XVI GUSTAF SVERIGES KONUNG ("CARL XVI GUSTAF KING OF SWEDEN")( (since 1973). On the reverse, its fitted is the association's emblem, a winged grenade with Three Crowns, and the inscription SVERIGES CIVILFÖRSVARSFÖRBUND ("SWEDISH CIVIL PROTECTION ASSOCIATION") as well as a plate for engraving the recipient's name and year of awarding. The medal is crowned with a royal crown.

Ribbon
The medal is attached to a 35 mm wide dark blue ribbon with moiré pattern.

Criteria

Gold
The gold medal is usually awarded for at least 10 years of particularly meritorious service at national or district level and for exceptional contributions at association level. As a rule, the gold medal should only be awarded to those who have previously received the silver medal.

Silver
The silver medal is usually awarded for at least 5 years of meritorious service at national or district level and for exceptional contributions at association level. As a rule, the silver medal should not be awarded before the person in question has previously received the Swedish Civil Protection Association Merit Badge (SCFGFt) in gold.

Presenting
Awards are presented in solemn forms, usually at a district or association meeting or at another solemn occasion. The medal of merit is usually handed over at the Swedish Civil Protection Association's national assembly. As a rule, the quota of ten gold medals and thirty silver medals should not be exceeded at each meeting. If there are special reasons, the number may be exceeded following a decision by the national board and can also be awarded on other occasions than the national assembly. The right to propose the award of medals of merit belongs to a member of the national board, district board or association board. The national board decides on the awarding of medals of merit. Awards are accompanied by diplomas issued by the Swedish Civil Protection Association.

Wearing
Medals of merit and merit badges may be worn at the same time, but only the highest denomination within each award. Miniature medals for the medal of merit can be ordered through the national association's office.

Footnotes

References

Notes

Print

Orders, decorations, and medals of Sweden
Awards established in 1941
1941 establishments in Sweden